Kim Skoglund (born 28 August 1987) is a Swedish footballer who plays as a midfielder.

He started his career with IK Sirius in the Swedish lower divisions, making his senior debut in 2004 at age 16. He initially struggled to break into the first team, and enjoyed a two year stint at Gamla Upsala SK between 2009 and 2010, before returning to Sirius. He would then play a vital part as the club won several promotions and ultimately reached Allsvenskan, the Swedish top tier, in 2016. He was not offered a new contract at the end of the 2017 season, appearing in a total of 259 league games for Sirius.

On 12 January 2018, Skoglund signed a three year-deal with GIF Sundsvall, also playing in Allsvenskan.

References

Swedish footballers
Allsvenskan players
Superettan players
1987 births
Living people
Gamla Upsala SK players
IK Sirius Fotboll players
GIF Sundsvall players
IK Frej players
Association football midfielders
Footballers from Uppsala